Boston City Council elections were held on November 4, 1997. All 13 seats (nine district representatives and four at-large members) were contested in the general election. Eight seats (four districts and the four at-large members) had also been contested in the preliminary election held on September 23, 1997.

At-large
Councillors Francis Roache, Peggy Davis-Mullen, Dapper O'Neil, and Stephen J. Murphy were re-elected. Murphy had joined the council in February 1997, following the resignation of Richard P. Iannella. Iannella's sister Suzanne was an unsuccessful candidate in this election.

District 1
Councillor Diane J. Modica lost her seat to Paul Scapicchio.

District 2
Councillor James M. Kelly was re-elected.

District 3
Councillor Maureen Feeney was re-elected.

District 4
Councillor Charles Yancey was re-elected.

District 5
Councillor Daniel F. Conley was re-elected.

District 6
Councillor Maura Hennigan was re-elected.

District 7
Councillor Gareth R. Saunders was re-elected.

District 8
Councillor Thomas M. Keane Jr. was re-elected.

District 9
Councillor Brian Honan was re-elected.

See also
 List of members of Boston City Council
 Boston mayoral election, 1997

References

Further reading
 
 
 

City Council election
Boston City Council elections
Boston City Council election
Boston City Council